Gueugnon is a commune in the Saône-et-Loire department in the region of Bourgogne-Franche-Comté in eastern France.

Population

Economy
The primary industry in the town is a stainless-steel factory run by Aperam. A huge part of Gueugnon's economy is based on cow breeding, mostly because the city is located in the Charolais area. There is also an industrial and touristic zone 3 kilometers south of Gueugnon called Chazey with a sand quarry, a transport company and 5 ponds mostly used by anglers and canoe clubs.

Gueugnon is a twin town of Otterberg, Germany.

Tourism

In Bourgogne-Franche-Comté, you can see :
 The Arboretum de Pézanin, one of the richest forest collection in France,
 The Rock of Solutré,
 The Cluny abbey, and its medieval city,
 Charolles and the "boeuf charolais",
 Mâcon, Paray-le-Monial,
The Canal Bridge in Digoin,
Diverti'Parc in Toulon sur Arroux,
Touroparc Zoo in Romanèche-Thorins,
Nicéphore-Niépce museum in Chalon-sur-Saône.

See also
 FC Gueugnon
Communes of the Saône-et-Loire department

References

External links

 Official website
Gueugnon: legend of the ferryman

Communes of Saône-et-Loire
Saône-et-Loire communes articles needing translation from French Wikipedia